The Northrop N-204 was a high altitude reconnaissance jet aircraft designed in the United States in the 1950s.

Development
In fall 1957, Northrop submitted a proposal to the United States Air Force for a subsonic high-altitude reconnaissance aircraft, having capitalized on their earlier N-165 design study. The concerns by CIA pilots that the Lockheed U-2 was being tracked by radars on spy missions over the Soviet Union prompted Northrop to make low observable technology a part of the N-204 design, as was later done with the Lockheed A-12.

Although Northrop estimated that the N-204 could go into service in 1960, the N-204 project did not proceed to the hardware stage.

Design
The N-204 was similar to the Lockheed U-2 and Yakovlev Yak-25RV in having long, straight wings like an ordinary sailplane, and a v-tail. However, the engines of the aircraft were not buried in the wing roots or podded under the wings, but instead were buried in the outboard end of the wing center-section.

Specifications (estimated)

See also

References

N-204
N-204, Northrop